The Frey Ranch, at 1140 W. Peckham Ln. near Reno, Nevada, dates from 1870, when a  ranch was founded.  A  site of its main house, including Late Victorian architecture, survives.  It was listed on the National Register of Historic Places in 1999;  the listing included three contributing buildings.

The three historic buildings are the main ranchhouse (begun c.1870-1875), a cookhouse/bunkhouse, and a
creamery/meathouse.  The property was deemed significant "for its association with the development of agriculture and irrigation in the Truckee Meadows during the nineteenth and twentieth centuries, and for its role in Reno's famous divorce trade during the 1920s and 1930s."  It also is important for having served the Comstock Lode area with agricultural products.

In 1999 the site was located in an unincorporated area of Washoe County near Reno.

References 

National Register of Historic Places in Washoe County, Nevada
Victorian architecture in Nevada
Buildings and structures completed in 1870
Ranches on the National Register of Historic Places in Nevada
Houses in Washoe County, Nevada